A list of the tallest structures in the US that are at least 350 meters, ordered by height. Most are guyed masts used for FM- and TV-broadcasting:

See also
List of tallest structures in the United States, state-by-state listing

References

Tallest structures in the United States